TV Globinho (former Globinho) was a popular children's television program produced by Rede Globo. It was dedicated to cartoons and anime and was broadcast from July 3, 2000 until August 1, 2015. The strand was responsible for introducing several shows that became the most successful in recent years, being the most watched children's show on Brazilian TV in the 2000s. TV Globinho became popular for broadcasting shows like Dragon Ball Z and SpongeBob SquarePants.

In June 2012, the program went off the air on weekdays being broadcast only on Saturdays, losing its weekday morning timeslot for the talkshow Encontro com Fátima Bernardes which caused a great uproar among the Brazilian public. In August 1, 2015, TV Globinho was discontinued losing its timeslot for the program É De Casa.

References 

Rede Globo original programming
Brazilian children's television series